Georgina Ama Ankumah is a Ghanaian broadcast journalist and news presenter who currently works with GBC as the Ashanti Regional Correspondent. She is also the Ashanti Regional Secretary of the GJA.

Career 
Georgina is the Ashanti Regional Secretary of GJA and also trainer of IFJ.

References 

Ghanaian women journalists
Ghanaian journalists
Living people
Year of birth missing (living people)